Riise can refer to:

John Arne Riise, retired Norwegian football player
Albert Heinrich Riise, Danish pharmacist and manufacturer on St. Thomas in the Danish West Indies
Bjørn Helge Riise, Norwegian retired football player
Hege Riise, retired football player, formerly with Carolina Courage, and former captain of Norway women's national team

Norwegian-language surnames